Okter Petrisek was a male international table tennis player from Czechoslovakia. 

He won a silver medal at the 1936 World Table Tennis Championships in the men's doubles, teaming with Stanislav Kolář.

See also
 List of table tennis players
 List of World Table Tennis Championships medalists

References

Czechoslovak table tennis players
World Table Tennis Championships medalists